Frank J. "Pat" Dodd (February 4, 1938 – May 14, 2010) was an American businessman and Democratic Party politician who served as President of the New Jersey Senate from 1974 to 1975.

Early life
Dodd was born in Orange, New Jersey in 1938. He was educated at Upsala College and Seton Hall University. He founded Dodd Enterprises, operating two cocktail lounges, a restaurant, and a travel agency, based out of West Orange.

Political career
Dodd was elected to the New Jersey General Assembly at the age of 27, serving for two terms, from 1966 to 1970. In the Assembly Dodd served on the Labor Relations, Banking and Insurance, and Public Safety, Defense, and Veteran's Affairs Committees.

In 1971 Dodd was elected to the New Jersey Senate to represent the 11th Legislative District and was re-elected in 1973 in the 26th Legislative District. He served as Senate president from 1974 to 1975, also serving as acting governor during that time.

In the 1977 Democratic primary for the Senate seat, Dodd faced opposition from  Assemblyman Eldridge Hawkins and tennis star Althea Gibson, who was serving as state Athletic Commissioner. Dodd was supported by the Essex County Democratic organization under County Chairman Harry Lerner. With Gibson and Hawkins splitting the anti-organization vote, Dodd won the nomination and the subsequent general election. In 1981, Dodd gave up his Senate seat to run in the Democratic primary for Governor of New Jersey. His successor in the Senate in the area was Richard Codey.

The 1981 Democratic primary included a crowded field of 13 candidates, led by U.S. Representative James Florio, U.S. Representative Robert A. Roe, Newark Mayor Kenneth A. Gibson, Senate President Joseph P. Merlino, Attorney General John J. Degnan, and Jersey City Mayor Thomas F. X. Smith. Dodd finished in seventh place with 4 percent of the vote behind Florio (26 percent), Roe (16 percent), Gibson (16 percent), Merlino (11 percent), Degnan (11 percent), and Smith (9 percent).

Career after politics
In the fall of 1981, Dodd was selected by governor-elect Thomas Kean and outgoing governor Brendan Byrne to serve as the chairman of the New Jersey Hazardous Waste Siting Commission, tasked with selecting sites for toxic waste incinerators. The commission received heavy public criticism for its recommendation of potential toxic waste sites throughout the state.

In 1989, Kean appointed Dodd to a five-year term on the New Jersey Casino Control Commission. He served until the end of 1993.

Dodd later competed as a sport fisherman, participating in billfish tournaments in Key West and the Turks and Caicos Islands. He resided in Manasquan, New Jersey. He died on May 14, 2010 in Neptune Township, New Jersey.

References

External links
Frank J. Dodd  at The Political Graveyard

1938 births
2010 deaths
Upsala College alumni
People from Manasquan, New Jersey
People from Orange, New Jersey
Politicians from Essex County, New Jersey
Seton Hall University alumni
Republican Party members of the New Jersey General Assembly
Republican Party New Jersey state senators
Presidents of the New Jersey Senate
Members of American gaming commissions